Into the Sun is a 1992 action comedy film involving a pilot and actor thrown into a dangerous situation. The film stars Michael Paré and Anthony Michael Hall.

Plot
Paul "Shotgun" Watkins (Michael Paré) is an American pilot stationed in Sicily who patrols the Middle East. He is taken off his normal duties to orient Tom Slade (Anthony Michael Hall), a conceited actor about being a pilot in United States Air Force for an upcoming film role. Slade wants to "get the feeling" before he plays the part in a movie about fighter pilots. When shown fighter aircraft, Tom says dismissively: "F-14, F-16, whatever. I'm not good with numbers. I've got accountants for numbers." Paul is determined to show the cocky Hollywood actor that being a fighter pilot isn't as easy as Slade thinks it is. But after Slade, with no flying experience whatsoever excels during a flight simulator session, Paul begins to question the value of his own flying ability. In a subsequent scene where Paul accompanies Slade to an oxygen-deprivation chamber so that the actor can better understand the importance of maintaining composure at high altitudes, Slade appears unaffected while Paul, far more experienced in such an environment, eventually winds up becoming disoriented as has to have his oxygen mask placed on him by the simulation's proctor. Ultimately, Watkins takes Slade for a ride in an F-16 fighter and subjects him to extreme aerial maneuvers. Paul is gratified when the actor becomes disoriented and nearly vomits. Soon thereafter, having inadvertently crossed into the airspace of a hostile country, they are shot down and find themselves stranded behind enemy lines. Paul and Slade must then find a way to mend their differences and find a way back to safety.

The movie's title is used during one exchange where Slade is discussing the script with Paul. In the script, the pilot, facing a dire situation from which he will likely not make it back from, riffs in a John Wayne-ish accent that, upon being shot down and facing the prospect of a crash landing, says he has no problem with death and it's akin to "flying right into the sun."
Paul thinks this bit of dialogue is not very realistic. When Slade asks Paul what he would say in such a dire situation, Paul responds, "Oh, I don't know. Maybe something like OH SH*T!"

Cast
 Anthony Michael Hall as Tom Slade
 Michael Paré as Captain Paul "Shotgun" Watkins
 Deborah Moore as Major Goode (as Deborah Maria Moore)
 Terry Kiser as Mitchell Burton
 Brian Haley as Lieutenant DeCarlo
 Michael St. Gerard as Lieutenant Wolf
 Linden Ashby as "Dragon"
 Melissa Moore as Female Sergeant

Production
Into the Sun began shooting March 12, 1991 with principal photography completed on April 25, 1991. Most of its aerial footage are taken from Iron Eagle movie stock (hence its Israeli Air Force camouflage, but USAF roundels). The filming in Israel provided the aerial sequences choreographed by Jim Gavin, whose earlier works include Blue Thunder.

Reception
Film historian and reviewer Leonard Maltin noted that Into the Sun was very similar to scenario seen in The Hard Way (1991) starring Michael J. Fox and James Woods. The two films, however had a "change of milieu and budget. He summarized his appraisal as "aerial stunts aren't bad considering the threadbare production values, but it's only for those who'll try out anything that pops up on the video store shelves."

Janet Maslin in her review for The New York Times, noted that the comedy elements dominated. "Mr. Hall, whose earlier performances (in films like "National Lampoon's Vacation" and "Sixteen Candles") have been much goofier, remains coolly funny and graduates to subtler forms of comedy with this role. ... Mr. Pare, who looks like a model and sounds like a wrier version of Sylvester Stallone, makes an appropriately staunch straight man. He and Deborah Maria Moore, as the pert major who attracts both Tom and Shotgun, give the film a decorative luster it might otherwise lack. Terry Kiser has some amusing moments as the loudmouth talent manager who, asked if the "star" and "sensation" who is his client can be described as "Tom Slade, the actor," pauses nervously. He thinks that may be going too far."

References

Notes

Citations

Bibliography

 Maltin, Leonard.  Leonard Maltin's 2007 Movie Guide. New York: New American Library, 2006. .

External links
 
 
 

1992 films
American action comedy films
1992 action comedy films
American aviation films
Trimark Pictures films
Films directed by Fritz Kiersch
1990s English-language films
1990s American films